Sharon Farrell (born December 24, 1940) is an American television and film actress, and former dancer. Originally beginning her career as a ballerina with the American Ballet Theatre company, Farrell made her film debut in 1959 in Kiss Her Goodbye, followed by roles in 40 Pounds of Trouble (1962), A Lovely Way to Die (1968), and the neo-noir Marlowe (1969). She worked prolifically in television, including recurring parts in the series Saints and Sinners (1962), Dr. Kildare (1965),  and Hawaii Five-O (1977–1980).

Farrell's other roles include Larry Cohen's horror film It's Alive (1974), Dennis Hopper's drama film Out of the Blue (1980), and the teen comedy Can't Buy Me Love (1987). She continued to appear in television and film until 1999. In 2013, she reappeared in a minor role in the web series Broken at Love.

Early life
Born Sharon Forsmoe on Christmas Eve 1940 in Sioux City, Iowa, she is of Norwegian descent, and was raised in a Lutheran family. During her childhood, Farrell studied ballet and was involved in the theater department during high school. Farrell toured with the American Ballet Theatre Company as a dancer, which brought her to New York City.

Career
She made her acting debut at age 18 in the 1959 film Kiss Her Goodbye. Throughout the 1960s to the 1980s, Farrell appeared in such films as The Reivers (1969), Marlowe (1969), It's Alive (1974), The Stunt Man (1980), Out of the Blue (1980), Night of the Comet (1984), and Can't Buy Me Love (1987). She took her stage name combining her father's name Darrel, with "F" for Forsmoe and two "L"s.

In addition to film work, Farrell also appeared in guest roles on various television shows including Death Valley Days, Gunsmoke (“Trip West” in 1964), The Man from U.N.C.L.E, I Dream of Jeannie,
My Favorite Martian, The Beverly Hillbillies, Harry O,  and Hawaii Five-O. In 1991 she joined the cast of the long-running soap opera The Young and the Restless, remaining with the show until 1996. Farrell's most recent television role was in a 1999 episode of JAG.

Between 2013 and 2014, Farrell appeared in the web series Broken at Love, marking her first on-screen appearance in fourteen years.

Personal life
Farrell's first marriage was to actor Andrew Prine in 1962. They later divorced reportedly after only living together for one month and ten days.

Farrell has one son, Chance Boyer, born when she was married to actor John F. Boyer. After Chance's birth in 1970, Farrell suffered an embolism which caused her heart to stop beating for four minutes. She ended up with serious brain damage that resulted in memory loss and physical impairments. With the help of colleagues, Farrell worked to regain her abilities, including her memory, and resumed her acting career, yet she kept her illness a secret under the advice of friend and actor Steve McQueen, who warned her that if word of her illness got out, her career would be over. Keeping her illness hidden, Farrell worked steadily for decades.

Farrell was also married to Ron DeBlasi, Steve Salkin, and director Dale Trevillion. She had romantic relationships with actors Steve McQueen and Bruce Lee.

In December 2013, Farrell self-published her autobiography Hollywood Princess from Sioux City, Iowa.

Filmography

Film

Television

References

Notes

Sources

External links

 
Sharon Farrell at the American Film Institute
Sharon Farrell "Hollywood Princess" From Sioux City, Iowa

1940 births
Actors from Sioux City, Iowa
Actresses from Iowa
American ballerinas
American film actresses
American Lutherans
American people of Norwegian descent
American soap opera actresses
American television actresses
Living people
20th-century American actresses
21st-century American actresses